Szczyglice may refer to the following places in Poland:
Szczyglice, Lower Silesian Voivodeship (south-west Poland)
Szczyglice, Lesser Poland Voivodeship (south Poland)